Girmay is a surname. Notable people with this name include:

 Biniam Girmay (born 2000), Eritrean professional road cyclist
 Girmay Zahilay (born 1987), American politician serving as a member of the King County Council in the state of Washington
 Aracelis Girmay (born 1977), American poet
 Dagmawit Girmay Berhane (born 1975), Ethiopian sports director

See also 
 Girma